The Asian Cricket Council Women's Asia Cup or ACC Women's Asia Cup is a women's One Day International and Twenty20 International cricket tournament. It was established in 2004 and is a biennial tournament. The tournament is contested by cricket teams from Asia. 

The first Women's Asia Cup was held in 2004 on Colombo and Kandy in the Sri Lanka. The 2020 edition was postponed to 2021 due to Covid-19 pandemic before being cancelled. The ICC has ruled that all the matches played in the Women's Asia Cup has ODI or T20I status. The 2012 Women's Asia Cup was the first event to be played in the T20 format.

History

One-Day Internationals

2004
The first Women's Asia Cup was played in Sri Lanka in April 2004. Only two teams took part, India and Sri Lanka and they played a five match One-Day International series against each other. India won all five matches and won the first Women's Asia Cup.

2005-2006
Karachi, Pakistan hosted the second Women's Asia Cup in December 2005 and January 2006. Pakistan made their first appearance in the tournament. India again won the tournament, beating Sri Lanka by 97 runs in the final.

2006
The third Women's Asia Cup tournament was played in Jaipur, India in December 2006. The tournament went very much the way of the previous event. India beat Sri Lanka in the final, this time by eight wickets.

2008
The fourth Women's Asia Cup tournament was played in Sri Lanka in May 2008. India again won the tournament, defeating Sri Lanka by 177 runs in the final.

Twenty20 cricket

2012
The fifth Women's Asia Cup Tournament was played in Guanggong Cricket Stadium, Guangzhou, China from 24 to 31 October 2012. India defeated Pakistan by 19 runs in the final

2016
The sixth Women's Asia Cup tournament was played in Thailand, from 27 November to 4 December 2016. India beat Pakistan by 17 runs in the final, becoming champion for the 6th time consecutively.

2018
The seventh Women's Asia Cup tournament was played in Malaysia, from 3 June to 10 June 2018. Bangladesh beat six-time winner India by 3 wickets in the final to clinch their first Asia Cup title.

2022
A tournament was due to take place in 2020 in Bangladesh, but was postponed to 2021 (and eventually 2022) due to the COVID-19 pandemic. The 2022 edition of the tournament took place at Sylhet, Bangladesh in October 2022.
India beat Sri Lanka in the final, this time by eight wickets by chasing a modest total of 65 and became 7th time winner.Jemimah Rodrigues was the highest run scorer of this tournament.

Results

Performance by team
Legend
 – Champions
 – Runners-up
 – Third place 
 - Semi-finalists
GS – Group stage
Q – Qualified

Debutant teams in main tournament

See also

 Asia Cup - the equivalent men's event
 Asian Test Championship
 ACC Emerging Teams Asia Cup
 ACC Under-19 Cup

References

 
Women's One Day International cricket competitions
Women's Twenty20 cricket international competitions
Cricket in Asia
Asian championships
2004 establishments in Asia